The 2011 Scottish Youth Cup Final was the final match of the 2010–11 Scottish Youth Cup, the 27th season of the Scottish Youth Cup. It was played by the U19 sides of Old Firm rivals Celtic and Rangers.

Route to the Final

Celtic

Celtic entered the competition in the third round. They began their campaign against Dundee winning 6–1 at Lennoxtown, thanks to goals from Patrik Twardzik, Callum Bagshaw, Callum McGregor, Stephen O'Donnell and Liam Gormley (2). Celtic then played Airdrie United again at Lennoxtown. Goals by James Keatings, Callum McGregor, Filip Twardzik, Patrik Twardzik and Liam Gormley gave The Bhoys a comfortable 5–1 win. In the quarter final, Celtic played Stenhousemuir again taking place at Lennoxtown. It took Celtic until the 43rd minute to break the deadlock through James Keatings, the other goals came from Filip Twardzik, Liam Gormley and Bahrudin Atajić therefore Celtic ran out 4–0 winners. Celtic then took on Livingston in the semi-finals, yet another home match, however, this time the match took place at Celtic Park with Celtic running out 3-0 winners courtesy of goals from Filip Twardzik and James Keatings (2).

This Youth Cup final was the 15th in Celtic's history. They had won 10 of them prior to this final, the last in 2010, which means Celtic are the most successful team in the history of the tournament.

Rangers

Rangers entered the competition in the third round. They began their campaign against Deveronvale emphatically winning 13–0 at Rangers Training Centre, thanks to goals from Max Wright (4), Kal Naismith (4), Rhys McCabe (3), Robbie Crawford and Darren Cole. Rangers then played Hamilton Academical again at Rangers Training Centre. Goals by Kane Hemmings (2) (1st pen.), and Max Wright gave The Gers a 3-2 win. In the quarter final, Rangers played Ayr United, this time it was an away match, taking place at Somerset Park. Rangers eventually won 6-2 after being 2-1 down at half-time, scorers for Rangers were Andy Mitchell (2), Kal Naismith, Kyle McAusland, Rhys McCabe and Dylan McGeouch. Rangers then took on Hibernian in the semi-finals, another home match, however, this time the match took place at Ibrox with Rangers running out narrow 1-0 winners courtesy of a goal from Chris Hegarty.

This Youth Cup final was the 13th in Rangers' history. They had won 5 of them prior to this final, the last in 2008, which means Rangers are the second-most successful team in the history of the tournament.

Match details

References

2011
Scottish Youth Cup Final 2011
Scottish Youth Cup Final 2011
Final